Peter Oloo-Aringo is a Kenyan politician. He previously represented the Alego Constituency in the National Assembly of Kenya in two separate stints between 1974 - 1988 and 1997-2002. He currently serves on the Salaries and Remuneration Commission.

References

Living people
Year of birth missing (living people)
Orange Democratic Movement politicians
Members of the National Assembly (Kenya)